Las modelos (Spanish for "the models") may refer to:

 Las modelos (film), a 1963 Argentine film directed by Vlasta Lah
 Las modelos (telenovela), a 1963 Mexican telenovela produced by Teleprogramas Acapulco, SA

See also
 Modelo (disambiguation), including La Modelo